Conan the Guardian is a fantasy novel  by American writer Roland Green, featuring Robert E. Howard's  sword and sorcery hero Conan the Barbarian. It was first published in paperback by Tor Books in January 1991, and reprinted in October 1997 and August 2000.

Plot
Conan and other former mercenaries take employment as bodyguards for Lady Livia, head of one of the ruling merchant houses of Argos. Livia is threatened by a rival seeking to gain personal control of all Argos, who is secretly backed by a sorcerer.

Reception
Writing of this novel, reviewer Don D'Ammassa noted that "Green's Conan is a good deal more sophisticated, even as a young man, than he is portrayed in most of the books by other authors."

References

External links
Page at Fantastic Fiction 

1991 American novels
1991 fantasy novels
Conan the Barbarian novels
Novels by Roland J. Green
American fantasy novels
Tor Books books